The 2003 Solihull Metropolitan Borough Council election took place on 1 May 2003 to elect members of Solihull Metropolitan Borough Council in the West Midlands, England. 
One third of the council was up for election and the Conservative Party stayed in overall control of the council.

Campaign
Before the election the Conservatives ran the council with 28 seats, compared to 13 for Labour and 10 for the Liberal Democrats, with 17 seats being contested in the election. The election came after a by-election in Shirley West ward in March 2003, which saw the Liberal Democrats gain the seat on a swing of 26%, making that ward a key seat in the election.

Issues in the election included broad opposition to windfall development, while Labour campaigned on a north-south divide they said was evident in the council. Proposals for the expansion of Birmingham Airport divided the parties, with the Conservatives and Liberal Democrats opposing expansion, while almost all Labour councillors supported it. A recent increase in council tax of 11% was another issue in the election, with the ruling Conservative group blaming the increase on the national Labour government due to a change in the grant, but the Labour Local Government Minister Nick Raynsford said the increase was double that of other local Labour controlled councils.

Election result
The results saw the Conservatives keep a 5-seat majority on the council. The Conservatives gained one seat from the Liberal Democrats in Packwood ward, but lost another one back to the Liberal Democrats in Shirley West.

This result had the following consequences for the total number of seats on the council after the elections :

Ward results

References

2003 English local elections
2003
2000s in the West Midlands (county)